The 1996 European Promotion Cup for Men was the 5th edition of this tournament. It was hosted in Serravalle, San Marino and Austria achieved its second title after beating Norway in the final game.

Preliminary round

Group A

Group B

Classification games

Final round

Bracket

Final

Final ranking

External links
FIBA Archive

1996
1995–96 in European basketball
1996 in San Marino
International basketball competitions hosted by San Marino
June 1996 sports events in Europe